Talbotton is a city in Talbot County, Georgia, United States. The population was 970 at the 2010 census. The city is the county seat of Talbot County.

History
Talbotton was founded in 1828 as the seat of the newly formed Talbot County. Both the county and the town were named for Governor Matthew Talbot.

Talbotton may be best known in history as the place where the immigrant Straus family got their start in retail sales in the 19th century. In 1896, the family acquired R. H. Macy & Co. in New York.

Geography
Talbotton is located at  (32.678170, -84.539787).

The city is located in the central portion of the county along U.S. Route 80, which runs north to south through the main part of town, and turns east leaving town. U.S. Route 80 leads east  to Roberta and southwest  to Columbus. Georgia State Routes 90 and 208 also run through the city as well, with GA 90 leading southeast  to Junction City and GA 208 leading west  to Waverly Hall.

Climate
Talbotton has a humid subtropical climate (Köppen Cfa), with hot, humid summers and mild winters.

On March 3, 2019, an EF4 tornado struck the town at low-end EF3 strength, causing major damage to structures and trees in the town.

Demographics

2020 census

As of the 2020 United States census, there were 742 people, 372 households, and 222 families residing in the city.

2010 census
As of the census of 2010, there were 970 people, 384 households, and 246 families residing in the city. The racial makeup of the city was 15.10% White, 84.10% African American, 0.20% Native American, 0.00% Asian, 0.20% from other races, and 0.40% from two or more races. Hispanic or Latino of any race were 1.90% of the population.

There were 384 households, out of which 21.4% had children under the age of 18 living with them, 28.1% were married couples living together, 29.9% had a female householder with no husband present, and 35.9% were non-families. 29.4% of all households were made up of individuals, and 13.8% had someone living alone who was 65 years of age or older.  The average household size was 2.66 and the average family size was 3.27.

In the city, the population was spread out, with 27.8% under the age of 18, 9.5% from 18 to 24, 26.7% from 25 to 44, 22.4% from 45 to 64, and 13.6% who were 65 years of age or older.  The median age was 36 years. For every 100 females, there were 75.4 males.  For every 100 females age 18 and over, there were 68.0 males.

The median income for a household in the city was $19,940, and the median income for a family was $24,792. Males had a median income of $27,250 versus $17,778 for females. The per capita income for the city was $10,662.  About 30.5% of families and 32.5% of the population were below the poverty line, including 44.2% of those under age 18 and 27.8% of those age 65 or over.

Education 
The Talbot County School District headquarters is located in the city as well as the only school building in the entire county. The district and school has 48 full-time teachers and over 792 students.
Central Elementary/High School

Notable people

 John W. Bower, signatory to the Texas Declaration of Independence, member of the House of Representatives of the Republic of Texas, and Chief justice of Refugio County, Texas; born in Talbotton.
Charles Henry Jones, journalist, editor, and political figure, born in Talbotton.
Clarence Jordan, farmer and New Testament Greek scholar; born in Talbotton.
 George W. Towns, U.S. Representative, and the 39th Governor of Georgia from 1847 to 1851; former resident of Talbotton.
 Lady, American rapper; born in Talbotton.
Elizabeth Evelyn Wright, founder of Voorhees College; born in Talbotton.
Isidor Strauss, U.S. Representative from the NY-15 district (1894-1895) and co-founder of Macy's Department Store, who died during the sinking of the R.M.S. Titanic, lived in Talbotton as a youth.

Gallery

References

External links
 
 City-Data.com Comprehensive Statistical Data and more about Talbotton

Cities in Georgia (U.S. state)
Cities in Talbot County, Georgia
County seats in Georgia (U.S. state)